Gorna Ǵonovica is a village in the municipality of Gostivar, North Macedonia.

Name
The name stems from the Albanian name Gjon plus the Slavic suffix ov/ica.

Demographics
As of the 2021 census, Gorna Ǵonovica had 40 residents with the following ethnic composition:
Albanians 39
Persons for whom data are taken from administrative sources 1

According to the 2002 census, the village had a total of 8 inhabitants. Ethnic groups in the village include:

Macedonians 8

References

External links

Villages in Gostivar Municipality
Albanian communities in North Macedonia